Henry Seawell (alternatively spelled Sewell) (born c. 1610 - died c. 1644) was an American colonial politician, merchant, and landowner. He was a member of the Virginian House of Burgesses. Sewell's Point is named for Seawell.

He was burgess for Elizabeth City in 1632 and for Norfork County in 1639.

Seawell married Alice and had a son named Henry Seawell (born May 1, 1639; died 1672) and a daughter Anne Seawell (born c. 1634). Anne married Lemuel Mason, also a member of the House of Burgesses.

References

1610s births
1640s deaths
House of Burgesses members